Below is a list of squads at the FIBA World Olympic Qualifying Tournament for Women 2008:

Angola
 Maria Afonso
 Jaquelina Francisco
 Domitila Ventura
 Ângela Cardoso
 Isabel Francisco
 Barbara Guimaraes
 Irene Guerreiro
 Sonia Guadalupe
 Astrida Vicente
 Judith Queta
 Nadir Manuel
 Nassecela Mauricio
 coach: Raul Duarte

Argentina
 Mariana Cava
 Verónica Soberón
 Sthefany Thomas
 Melisa Daniela Cejas
 Sandra Pavón
 María Gimena Landra
 Paula Gatti
 Marcella Pauletta
 María Alejandra Fernández
 Constanza Landra
 Carolina Sánchez
 Florencia Fernández
 coach: Eduardo Pinto

Belarus
 Olga Padabed
 Olga Masilionene
 Katsiaryna Snytsina
 Tatsiana Likhtarovich
 Sviatlana Volnaya
 Natallia Anufryienka
 Anastasiya Verameyenka
 Yelena Leuchanka
 Natallia Marchanka
 Tatyana Troina
 Nataliya Trafimava
 Marina Kress
 coach: Anatoly Buyalski

Brazil
 
 
 
 
 Iziane Castro Marques
 
 
 
 
 Franciele Nascimento
 
 Kelly Santos
 coach: Paulo Roberto Bassul

Chinese Taipei
 Huang Fan-shan
 Chien Wei-chuan
 Chiang Feng-chun
 Wen Chi
 Lin Chi-wen
 Chu Yung-hsu
 Tsai Pei-chen
 Cheng Hui-yun
 Lin Hui-mei
 Ma Yi-hung
 Li Wan-ting
 Liu Chia-hsiu
 coach: Hong Ling-yao

Cuba
 Arleys Romero
 Ineidis Casanova
 Yakelyn Plutin
 Oyanaias Gelis
 Yulizeny Soria
 Yamara Amargo
 Yayma Boulet
 Marlen Cepeda
 Clenia Noblet
 Taimy Fernandez
 Leidys Oquendo
 Suchitel Avila
 coach: Alberto Zabala

Czech Republic
 Jana Vesela
 Ivana Vecerova
 Romana Hejdova
 Michala Hartigova
 Micaela Uhrova
 Hana Machová
 Edita Sujanova
 Romana Stehlikova
 Markéta Mokrosova
 Petra Kulichova
 Katerina Elhotova
 Eva Viteckova
 coach: Jan Bobrovsky

Fiji
 Letava Whippy
 Mikaelar Whippy
 Boulou Tuisou
 Valerie Nainima
 Brittany Hazelman
 Ofa Moce
 Seini Dobui
 Mareta Mani
 Alisi Tabulaevu
 Lusiani Robanakadavu
 Kelera Maitaika
 Vitorina Matila
 coach: Mike Whippy

Japan
 Yuko Aizawa
 Noriko Koiso
 Naomi Yoshiro
 Sachiko Ishikawa
 AI Mittani
 Mayumi Funabiki
 Ryoko Yano
 Jumiko Yamada
 Asami Yoshido
 Yuko Oga
 Riko Tanaka
 Ryoko Utsumi
 coach: Tomohide Utsumi

Latvia
 Elīna Babkina
 Anda Eibele
 Zane Eglīte
 Zane Teilāne-Tamane
 Gunta Baško
 Liene Jansone
 Anete Jēkabsone-Žogota
 Aija Putniņa
 Dita Krumberga
 Ieva Tāre
 Ieva Kubliņa
 Aija Brumermane
 coach: Ainārs Zvirgzdiņš

Senegal
 Fatou Dieng
 Aya Traore
 Awa Gueye
 Ndèye Sène
 Mame Diodio Diouf
 Salimata Diatta
 Tening Sabelle Diata
 Sokhna Lycka Sy
 Awa Doumbia
 Khady Diakhate
 Jeanne Senghor
 Bineta Diouf
 coach: Moustapha Gaye

Spain
 Laura Nicholls
 Cindy Lima
 Tamara Abalde
 Isabel Sánchez
 Lucila Pascua
 Laia Palau
 Elisa Aguilar
 Silvia Domínguez
 Anna Montañana
 Amaya Valdemoro
 María Revuelto
 Alba Torrens
 Coach: Evaristo Pérez

References

squads
Women's Olympic basketball squads